Talea is a commune in Prahova County, Muntenia, Romania. It is composed of two villages, Plaiu and Talea.

Natives
 Manole Aldescu (born 1929), cross-country skier

References

Communes in Prahova County
Localities in Muntenia